"Healing" is a song co-written and performed by American pop singer Fletcher, released on June 22, 2021. initially issued as a standalone single, the song appeared on the deluxe edition of her debut studio album Girl of My Dreams. The song was produced by frequent collaborator Malay.

Music video

The official music video for "Healing" was directed by Fletcher and Ava Rikki.

Chart positions

References

External links
 
 

2021 songs
2021 singles
Capitol Records singles
Fletcher (singer) songs
Music videos directed by Fletcher (singer)
Song recordings produced by Malay (record producer)
Songs written by Fletcher (singer)
Songs written by Scott Harris (songwriter)